Jasenko Sabitović (born 29 May 1973) is a Croatian retired football player who played for NK Zagreb, Pohang Steelers, Seongnam Ilhwa Chunma, Suwon Samsung Bluewings, Chunnam Dragons, NK Karlovac. He became naturalized as a South Korean citizen in 2004 and while playing there was known as Lee Savik.

Club career
He first came to South Korea in 1998, when he joined the Pohang Steelers from Croatian First League side NK Zagreb.

After he was released from the Suwon Samsung Bluewings, there was a rumour that he would go to Africa. However, he decided to stay in South Korea to play for the Chunnam Dragons.

International career
Although he was born in Tuzla, SR Bosnia and Herzegovina, SFR Yugoslavia, he played for the Croatian under-21 team because his mother is a Bosnian Croat. He won six international caps with the team in 1995. Because of this, he was eligible to play for Bosnia and Herzegovina, Croatia and South Korea.

External links
 

1973 births
Living people
Sportspeople from Tuzla
Naturalized citizens of South Korea
South Korean people of Bosnia and Herzegovina descent
South Korean people of Croatian descent
Association football central defenders
Croatian footballers
Croatia under-21 international footballers
Bosnia and Herzegovina footballers
HNK Gorica players
NK Zagreb players
Pohang Steelers players
Seongnam FC players
Suwon Samsung Bluewings players
Jeonnam Dragons players
NK Karlovac players
Croatian Football League players
K League 1 players
Croatian expatriate footballers
Bosnia and Herzegovina expatriate footballers
Expatriate footballers in South Korea
Croatian expatriate sportspeople in South Korea
Bosnia and Herzegovina expatriate sportspeople in South Korea